Zoltan (Zvi) Kluger (February 8, 1896 – May 16, 1977) was an Israeli photographer. He is known as one of the most important photographers in Mandatory Palestine.

Biography
Zoltan Kluger was born in the city of Kecskemet in Hungary in 1896. During World War I he served as an airborne photographer in the Austro-Hungarian Aviation Troops. At the end of the 1920s he emigrated to Berlin, the capital of Germany, where he worked as a press photographer. In April 1933, with the rise of the Nazis to power, he arrived to Palestine as a tourist, and then received a British certificate to stay, thanks to the intervention of Moshe Sharett. Later that year, Nachman Shifrin, whom Kluger met in Berlin, founded the "East Photography Society for the Press" in Tel Aviv. In 1934 Kluger joined Shifrin and became a partner and chief photographer.

Kluger's prominent clients were the JNF and Keren Hayesod photography department, which sent Kluger to photograph economic enterprises and immigrants. In 1937 Kluger took a series of 250 aerial photographs, commissioned by Zalman Schocken. The book "Ella Pnei Israel" was published in which Kluger's photographs are accompanied by a text by Moshe Shamir.

Kluger married Sarah, and the two had a son, Paul, who was sent in the early 1950s by the Israeli Air Force to study in the United States and remained there. In 1958, Kluger and his wife immigrated to the United States following their son. His wife threatened to commit suicide if they didn't follow their son. Kluger opened a photography shop in New York. At the same time, he made a living by filming events, mainly of the Hungarian community in New York. Shortly after the couple arrived in the United States, his wife fell ill and died, and he remarried to Irena. Kluger's mother and sister, Elsa survived the Holocaust in Hungary. His mother died in 1949, while her daughter, husband, daughter, husband and children emigrated to the United States in 1956 and settled in California. Kluger and his sister renewed their relationship. Kluger remained in the United States until his death.

Zoltan Kluger died in Manhattan, New York in 1977, leaving an archive of some 50,000 negatives distributed among several public archives, including the Keren Hayesod collection in the Central Zionist Archives, the Jewish National Fund collection, the Government Press Office, the State Archives and the IDF Archives. In 1968, a collection of about 40,000 negatives from the years 1933-1948 came to the State Archives, and in 2017 the entire collection was uploaded to the State Archives, which includes a search engine in pictures and can be used.

Exhibitions
Zoltan Kluger works have been exhibited in museums and galleries in Israel, including the Israel Museum. In 2008, the first solo exhibition of Zoltan Kluger was held at the Eretz Israel Museum in Tel Aviv. The exhibition was named "Zoltan Kluger - Principal Photographer, 1958-1933", curated by Dr. Ruth Oren and Guy Raz.

Gallery

References

External links

Zoltan Kluger application for Mandatory Palestine citizenship in Israeli State Archive.

See also
Photographers active in Mandate Palestine 1918-1948
Najib Anton Albina (1901–1983), master photographer of the Palestine Archaeological Museum
American Colony, Jerusalem#Photography: see for its Photographic Department, later Matson Photographic Service, active c. 1900-1940s
Armenians in Israel#Photographers: see for Armenian photographers in Jerusalem since 1857
Ze'ev (Wilhelm) Aleksandrowicz (1905-1992), Polish-born photographer, active in Mandate Palestine between 1932 and 1935
Ya'acov Ben-Dov (1882-1968), Israeli photographer and a pioneer of Jewish cinematography in Palestine
Khalil Raad (1854–1957), known as "Palestine's first Arab photographer"
David Rubinger (1924-2017), Israeli photographer, author of photo of paratroopers at the Western Wall in Six-Day War
Samuel Joseph Schweig (1905–1985), landscape and archaeology photographer in Mandate Palestine and early Israel
:de:Herbert Sonnenfeld (1906-1972), German Jewish photographer, husband of Leni, photographed in Mandate Palestine in the 1930s
Leni Sonnenfeld (1907-2004), German Jewish photographer, wife of Herbert, photographed Israel in the early years of its existence
Rudi Weissenstein (1910-1999), Israeli photographer, author of iconic Declaration of Independence picture

Israeli photographers
Hungarian photographers
1896 births
1977 deaths
People from Kecskemét
Israeli Jews
Israeli people of Hungarian-Jewish descent
Hungarian Jews
Jewish emigrants from Nazi Germany to Mandatory Palestine
Jews in Mandatory Palestine
Early photographers in Palestine